Rafael Castillo is a western suburb of Buenos Aires, located in La Matanza Partido, Buenos Aires Province, Argentina. It is part of the urban agglomeration of Greater Buenos Aires.

It is named after Rafael Castillo, lawyer and politician who served as the minister of the Interior of Argentina from 1904 to 1906 and owner of the lands where he planned the establishment of the town.

Rafael Castillo was declared a city by the Provincial Legislature on 18 October 1974.

According to the 2010 Census, the city had a total population of 147,965.

Notable people
 Oscar Garré (born 1956), footballer, part of the national squad that won the 1986 FIFA World Cup, was raised in Rafael Castillo.
 Leonardo Pisculichi (born 1984 in Rafael Castillo), footballer.

References

La Matanza Partido
Populated places in Buenos Aires Province
Cities in Argentina